Belotus is a genus of soldier beetles in the family Cantharidae. There are at least four described species in Belotus.

Species
These four species belong to the genus Belotus:
 Belotus abdominalis (LeConte, 1851)
 Belotus antillarum Leng & Mutchler
 Belotus bicolor Brancucci, 1979
 Belotus minutus Leng & Mutchler

References

Further reading

 
 
 

Cantharidae
Articles created by Qbugbot